Chuang Shih-ping,  (20 January 1911 – 2 June 2007) was a Hong Kong businessman who was the founder of the Hong Kong Nanyang Commercial Bank in 1949 and the Macau Banco Nan Tung in 1950. Zhuang was born in Puning, Guangdong and he came to Hong Kong in 1947. As a member of the pro-Beijing camp, Chuang was appointed a member of the Standing Committee of the CPPCC National Committee and a local National People's Congress delegate by the Chinese government. He was awarded the Grand Bauhinia Medal in July 1997 and was among the first to receive this honor.

Chuang died in Hong Kong from Heart failure on 2 June 2007. He was 96.

References

1911 births
2007 deaths
Hong Kong businesspeople
Recipients of the Grand Bauhinia Medal
Members of the Selection Committee of Hong Kong
Chinese emigrants to British Hong Kong